Woman of the Red Sea or Africa Under the Seas (Italian: Africa sotto i mari) is a 1953 Italian comedy film directed by Giovanni Roccardi and starring Sophia Loren, Steve Barclay and Umberto Melnati.

For the release of the film Loren, who had up to this point acted as Sofia Lazzaro, adopted her new screen name by which she became famous. This was partly in imitation of the then better-known Swedish actress Märta Torén. Loren learned to swim for the role, and spent much of her screen time in a bathing suit. This led one critic to worry that she was being turned into an Italian Esther Williams.

The film's sets were designed by Ottavio Scotti.

Synopsis
The troublesome daughter of an American millionaire accompanies him aboard his yacht on a deep sea diving expedition in the Red Sea and falls in love with the captain.

Cast
 Sophia Loren as Barbara Lama
 Steve Barclay as Paolo
 Umberto Melnati as Sebastiano Lama
 Alessandro Fersen as Prof. Krauss
 Antonio Cifariello as Pierluigi
 Antonio Bardi as Franco
 Masino Manunza as Masino
 Osman Omar as Ali
 Ibrahim Ahmed as Hussein
 Ahmed Ben Yusuf as Kassin

References

Bibliography
 Marinella Carotenuto. Sophia Loren. The quintessence of being an italian woman.. Mediane, 2009.
 Lucy Fischer & Marcia Landy. Stars: The Film Reader. Psychology Press, 2004.
 Kerry Segrave & Linda Martin. The continental actress: European film stars of the postwar era--biographies, criticism, filmographies, bibliographies. McFarland, 1990.

External links

1953 films
1953 comedy films
Italian comedy films
1950s Italian-language films
Seafaring films
Films featuring underwater diving
Films scored by Angelo Francesco Lavagnino
1950s Italian films